Dollyphyton is a genus of fossil with controversial interpretation from the Middle Ordovician (Darriwilian, 460 million years old) Douglas Lake Member of the Lenoir Limestone from Douglas Dam Tennessee. The generic name honors Dolly Parton whose Dollywood resort is nearby. The epithet honors Art Boucot.

Description
Dollyphyton is considered as a fossil peat moss by Gregory Retallack. Its leaves are wide and have lateral teeth. Its capsule is terminal on a short pseudopodium.

Interpretation
Unlike most peat mosses Dollyphyton has broad leaves like those of the living peat moss Flatbergium, considered basal to Sphagnales. Interpretation of this fossil as a peat moss has been doubted in some quarters but accepted in others.

References

Fossils of Tennessee
Fossil record of plants
Ordovician plants
Sphagnales
Prehistoric plant genera
Moss genera